Sculthorpe is a village and civil parish in the English county of Norfolk.

The villages name means 'Skuli's outlying farm/settlement'.

For the purposes of local government, the parish falls within the district of North Norfolk.

The former water mill, about a mile south of the parish church, is now a pub and restaurant, but some of the workings remain visible.

The large airfield of RAF Sculthorpe lies immediately to the west of the village.

Sculthorpe Moor Community Nature Reserve lies to the south of the village in Turf Moor Road

Notes 

http://kepn.nottingham.ac.uk/map/place/Norfolk/Sculthorpe

External links
 

North Norfolk
Villages in Norfolk
Civil parishes in Norfolk